Gao Shuxun (1897 – 1972) sometimes written Kao Shu-hsun, was a KMT general from Zhili Province.

Biography
In 1915, Gao Shuxun became a soldier of the Beijing government and was gradually promoted in the army led by Feng Yuxiang. In 1926, he was promoted to the commander of the Second Army of the National Revolutionary Army. In 1928, he led his army into Qinghai and surrendered Ma Qi, who dominated Qinghai. Later, he once acted as the chairman of the Qinghai provincial government.
In 1930, during the Central Plains War, Gao Shuxun fought with Chiang Kai-shek. After the defeat, Gao Shuxun surrendered to Chiang Kai-shek and was appointed the 27th Division Commander of the 26th Route Army. In 1931, in the third encirclement of the Chinese Workers' and Peasants' Red Army in Jiangxi Province, he suddenly left the army and fled to Tianjin. Later, Gao Shuxun secretly contacted the Communist Party of China. In 1933, Gao Shuxun joined Feng Yuxiang to organize the Chahar People's Anti-Japanese Allied Army in Chahar and served as the second commander of the Chahar People's Anti-Japanese Allied Army.
In 1937, after the outbreak of the Second Sino-Japanese War, Gao Shuxun served as the director of the Hebei Provincial Security Department and the general commander of the Hebei Guerrilla. In February 1939, he served as a member of the Chahar provincial government. In December 1940, due to Shi Yousan's attempt to surrender to Japan, Gao Shuxun arrested him and buried him alive by Chiang Kai-shek's secret order. In January 1941, he was promoted to deputy commander-in-chief of the 39th Army. In May of the same year, he also served as the commander of the new 8th Army. Since then, he has served as commander-in-chief of the 39th Army Group, commander-in-chief of the Jicha Theater, and deputy commander of the 11th Theater.

After the end of the War of Resistance Against Japan, on October 30, 1945, during the Battle of Handan, Gao Shuxun led the newly formed Eighth Army and the Hebei Civilian Army. The Central Committee of the Communist Party of China praised this. Soon Mao Zedong also launched the "Gao Shuxun Movement" to promote the Kuomintang army uprising, surrender, and accept the adaptation. On November 10, 1945, Gao Shuxun’s Democratic Founding Army was established. Gao Shuxun was appointed as the commander-in-chief of the Democratic Founding Army, Wang Dingnan was the director of the General Political Department, Fan Longzhang was the first army commander, and Qiao Mingli was the second army commander. On November 13, 1945, with the approval of the CPC Central Committee Secretariat, introduced by Deng Xiaoping and Bo Yibo, Gao Shuxun officially joined the Communist Party of China.
After the establishment of the Democratic National Founding Army, the Jinji Luyu Military Region sent a batch of political work cadres to the Democratic National Founding Army to carry out political work, but these cadres were not happy with the general of the Democratic National Founding Army. On June 14, 1947, the so-called "conspiracy riots" of the Democratic People's Republic of China were reported. On June 15, 1947, Gao Shuxun was arrested and examined for the "conspiracy uprising" of the Democratic Founding Army, and the designation of the Democratic Founding Army was revoked. One year after the review, no evidence was found, and Gao Shuxun was appointed deputy commander of the North China Military Region. Later, after the Third Plenary Session of the Eleventh Central Committee of the Communist Party of China, the injustice of the so-called "conspiracy riot" by the Democratic People's Founding Army was finally vindicated.

After the founding of the People’s Republic of China, Gao Shuxun served as the Vice Chairman of the People’s Government of Hebei Province, the Vice Governor of Hebei Province, the National People’s Congress, the National Defense Committee of the People ’s Republic of China, and the National Committee of the Chinese People ’s Political Consultative Conference.
On January 19, 1972, Gao Shuxun died in Beijing. He was 76 years old.

References

National Revolutionary Army generals from Hebei
People from Cangzhou
1897 births
1972 deaths